Gallaecimonas is a recently described genus of bacteria. The first described species of this genus was Gallaecimonas pentaromativorans gen. nov., sp. nov. isolated by Rodríguez Blanco et al. in 2010 from intertidal sediments of the ria of Corcubión (Galicia, Spain). It is a Gram-negative, rod-shaped, halotolerant bacterium in the class Gammaproteobacteria. It can degrade high molecular mass polycyclic aromatic hydrocarbons of 4 and 5 rings. The 16S rRNA gene sequences of the type strain CEE_131(T) proved to be distantly related to those of Rheinheimera and Serratia. Its G+C content was 41.7 mol%.

This bacterial ability to degrade high mass polycyclic aromatic compounds is interesting because these compounds are common pollutants spilled in the environment by human activities and tend to accumulate and persist adsorbed to the organic fraction of sediments. Many of those containing 4 to 6 rings are mutagenic, cancerogenic or teratogenic.

The genus name comes from the ancient Latin name of Galicia, Gallaecia, and monas, “monad”, and the term pentaromativorans (pent + aromati + vorans) refers to “degrading/devouring aromatic compounds with five rings”.

In 2012, Jianning Wang et al. isolated the species Gallaecimonas xiamenensis sp. nov. from a crude oil degrading consortium of microorganisms found in Xiamen island (China). Phylogenetic analysis based on 16S rRNA gene sequences of the strain 3C-1-T indicated it was a member of Gallaecimonas. It is a Gram-negative, rod-shaped, motile bacterium incapable of nitrate reduction, with a G+C content of 61.3 mol%.

References

External links
 Image from the International Journal of Systematic and Evolutionary Microbiology

Gammaproteobacteria
Bacteria genera